Tekovské Nemce is a village and municipality in Zlaté Moravce District of the Nitra Region, in western-central Slovakia.

History
In historical records the village was first mentioned in 1275.

Geography
It has a population of about 1,055 people.

References

External links
 http://www.e-obce.sk/obec/tekovskenemce/tekovske-nemce.html

Villages and municipalities in Zlaté Moravce District